Central Hawke's Bay District Council is the territorial authority for the Central Hawke's Bay District of New Zealand.

The council consists of the mayor of Central Hawke's Bay, and eight councillors elected at large.

Composition

Councillors

 Mayor: 
 Eight councillors elected at-large

History

The origins of the council date back to the Waipawa County Council, established in 1876.

Patangata County Council split off in 1885. Waipukurau County Council, Waipukurau Borough Council, Patangata County Council, Woodville County Council, Dannevirke County Council, and Waipawa Borough Council split off in 1908.

Waipukurau County Council merged with Patangata County Council in 1974 and Waipukurau Borough Council in 1977 to form Waipukurau District Council.

The other councils merged in 1978, to form Waipawa District Council.

Waipukurau District Council and Waipawa District Council merged in 1989, to create the modern council.

References

External links

 Official website

 
Politics of the Hawke's Bay Region
Territorial authorities of New Zealand